Charles Francis Swift (June 18, 1825 – May 1, 1903) was an American state politician and newspaper editor from Massachusetts. He served in the Massachusetts Senate, Massachusetts House of Representatives and was also collector of customs for the district of Barnstable.

Early life
Swift was born in Falmouth, Massachusetts and was educated at the local school. In 1839, aged 14, he began work in a printing office and by 1847 was assistant editor of The Yarmouth Register. He became editor in 1850, a position he held until his death. The Register was originally a Whig newspaper and was strongly anti-slavery. It subsequently supported the Republican Party, of which Swift was one of the leading lights in Barnstable county. Swift served as president of the Yarmouth Library Association, the Cape Cod Historical Society and the Barnstable County Agricultural Society. He was elected treasurer of the county of Barnstable in 1851, and subsequently re-elected three times.

State Legislature
In the November 1856 election, Swift was elected as state senator for the Barnstable County district, alongside John W. Atwood. In an eight man contest, Swift topped the poll with 24.2% of the vote. The following year the state was redistricted, with the new Cape district only entitled to one senator. Swift stood in the new district against two other candidates. He was duly re-elected with 52% of the vote. While in the senate he served on the committee on fisheries, election laws and the libraries, and was appointed chairman of the joint special committee on the pilotage laws. In November 1861 he was appointed collector of customs for the district of Barnstable by President Lincoln, a post he held for 15 years, apart from four months between November 1866 and March 1867.
In 1880 he ran for election to the state House of Representatives for the 3rd district of Barnstable county, which covered the towns of Yarmouth and Dennis. He was elected with 59% of the vote in a three man field. He ran for re-election in 1881, and won an overwhelming 99.1% of the vote. For both years he served as Chairman of the Committee on Prisons and on the Library. In his second term he served on the joint special committee for the revision of the laws of the Commonwealth.<ref>The Barnstable Patriot, May 04, 1903.</ref>

Personal life
Swift married Sarah A. Munroe of Barnstable in 1852. They had seven children: Hannah, Francis, Fred, Theodore, Caroline, Sarah and Charles. He wrote a number of historical works, among them the History of Old Yarmouth and the History of Cape Cod''. He died on May 1, 1903 at his home in Yarmouth, Massachusetts.

References

1825 births
1903 deaths
Republican Party members of the Massachusetts House of Representatives
Republican Party Massachusetts state senators
American newspaper editors
People from Falmouth, Massachusetts
19th-century American politicians